Little Tancook Island is a Canadian island located off the coast of Nova Scotia. The island is one of the 365 islands dotting Mahone Bay.

It is the second largest island in Mahone Bay after Big Tancook Island.

Islands of Mahone Bay